San Miguel Beermen is a professional basketball team in the Philippine Basketball Association.

San Miguel Beermen may also refer to:

San Miguel Beermen (3x3 team), 3x3 basketball team affiliated with the original franchise
San Miguel Beermen (ABL), defunct basketball team in the ASEAN Basketball League and an affiliate of the original franchise

See also
San Miguel Alab Pilipinas, active basketball team in the ASEAN Basketball League sponsored by the original franchise's owner